Baron Russell of Thornhaugh is a title in the Peerage of England. It was created in 1603 for the English military leader, the Honourable Sir William Russell. He was the fourth son of Francis Russell, 2nd Earl of Bedford. His son succeeded as Earl of Bedford in 1627 and the barony has been united with the earldom ever since.

Barons Russell of Thornhaugh (1603)
William Russell, 1st Baron Russell of Thornhaugh (c. 1558–1613)
Francis Russell, 2nd Baron Russell of Thornhaugh (1593–1641) (succeeded as 4th Earl of Bedford in 1627)

For further succession, see Duke of Bedford.

Family Tree

See also
Earl Russell
Baron Ampthill
Thornhaugh

References
Burkes Peerage

Baron
Baronies in the Peerage of England
Noble titles created in 1603